Statistics of Lebanese Premier League for the 1996–97 season.

Overview
Al-Ansar won the championship.

League standings

References
RSSSF

Leb
1996–97 in Lebanese football
Lebanese Premier League seasons
1996–97 Lebanese Premier League